is the second greatest hits album by Japanese singer Yōko Oginome. Released through Victor Entertainment on December 19, 1987, the album compiles Oginome's singles from 1985 to 1987,
plus re-recordings of four songs from 1984–85.

The album peaked at No. 3 on Oricon's albums chart and sold over 332,000 copies.

Track listing 
CD

 Tracks 14–15 not included in the LP and cassette releases.

Charts
Weekly charts

Year-end charts

References

External links
 
 

1987 greatest hits albums
Yōko Oginome compilation albums
Japanese-language compilation albums
Victor Entertainment compilation albums

ja:POP GROOVER The Best